Surp Marineh Church was one of eight churches existing in town of Moush before the Armenian genocide. Surp Marineh was the most notable church in whole Tarawn region of Historical Armenia, and was known as "Katoghike" ( meaning Cathedral). Currently it is in a ruinous state and only parts of the outer walls still stand.

References

Armenian Apostolic churches in Turkey
Armenian buildings in Turkey